Sandford is a village in the English county of Dorset, on the A351 road some two miles from Wareham and seven miles from Poole.

Sandford forms the only significant settlement within the civil parish of Wareham St. Martin, which otherwise covers much of the rural area to the north of Wareham. The parish forms part of the Purbeck local government district within the county of Dorset. It is within the Mid Dorset and North Poole constituency of the House of Commons. Prior to Brexit in 2020, it was in the South West England constituency of the European Parliament. The electoral ward is also called St.Martin, and includes Holton Heath with the surrounding countryside. The total population at the 2011 census was 2,774.

To the north lies Gore Heath, part of Wareham Forest, which is the subject of a controversial proposal for gravel extraction.

References

External links

Villages in Dorset